Cleome uncifera is a species of plant in the Cleomaceae family and is found in Western Australia.

It blooms between March and November producing yellow flowers.

It is found on sand plains and dunes and amongst granite outcrops in the Kimberley, Pilbara and Gascoyne regions of Western Australia growing in sandy-clay soils.

References

uncifera
Plants described in 1968
Flora of Western Australia